The 1957 South American Artistic Gymnastics Championships were held in Buenos Aires, Argentina, December 13, 1957.

Participating nations

Medalists

References

1957 in gymnastics
South American Gymnastics Championships
International gymnastics competitions hosted by Argentina
1957 in Argentine sport
 Sports competitions in Buenos Aires